Events from the year 1559 in Sweden

Incumbents
 Monarch – Gustav I

Events

 11 September - Duke John is sent to England to negotiate the wedding between Queen Elizabeth and Prince Erik. 
 13 December - Wedding between Princess Catherine and Edzard II, Count of East Frisia. A great scandal takes place when Princess Cecilia of Sweden and Johan II of East Frisia is discovered to have an illegal sexual relationship, known as Vadstenabullret.
 - The king and his sons make a solemn entry in to the capital.

Births

 1 January - Virginia Eriksdotter, illegitimate royal daughter  (died 1633)
 Margareta Brahe, courtier  (died 1638)

Deaths

 January - Christina Gyllenstierna, national heroine  (died 1497)

References

 
Years of the 16th century in Sweden
Sweden